Paweł Tomasz Wasilewski (July 23, 1982), known professionally as Paul Wesley, is an American actor, director and producer. He is known for starring as Stefan Salvatore on the supernatural drama series The Vampire Diaries (2009–2017) as well as his role as James T. Kirk in the Paramount+ original series Star Trek: Strange New Worlds (since 2022).

Early life
Paul Wesley was born in New Brunswick, New Jersey, to Polish parents Tomasz and Agnieszka Wasilewski, and grew up in Marlboro Township, New Jersey. He has one elder sister, Monika Emara (née Wasilewski), and two younger sisters, Leah and Julia.

In addition to English, he also speaks Polish, having spent four months of every year in Poland until the age of 16. Wesley attended Christian Brothers Academy in Lincroft, New Jersey, and Marlboro High School for a period during his high school years. He started his theater studies in New  York City and transferred from Marlboro High School to Lakewood Prep School in Howell, New Jersey, because the school was able to better accommodate his acting schedule. During his junior year in high school, he was cast in the soap opera Guiding Light as character Max Nickerson. He started college at Rutgers University in New Jersey but left after one semester when more roles were offered to him, and he realized he could make a career out of acting.

Career

2001–2008: Early acting roles and Fallen
In 2001, Wesley, then credited as Paul Wasilewski, was one of the main cast members of the short-lived CBS television series Wolf Lake, playing the role of Luke Cates. He appeared in the 2008 CBS television film The Russell Girl, and had the lead role in the 2007 ABC Family miniseries Fallen. Wesley has had a number of roles in television shows such as 24, 8 Simple Rules, American Dreams, Army Wives, Cane, Everwood, Guiding Light, Smallville, and The O.C..

2009–2017: The Vampire Diaries and film roles

Wesley starred as Stefan Salvatore in the hit television series The Vampire Diaries since its premiere in September 2009 on The CW. In the series, he played a younger brother to Damon Salvatore as well as the love interest of a 17-year-old girl named Elena Gilbert. His work garnered him two People's Choice Award nominations.

Throughout the years, he has appeared in a variety of films. In 2014, he co-starred in, as well as produced, Before I Disappear, which went on to win the SXSW Film Festival Audience Award and compete at the Venice Film Festival's "Venice Days" section. That same year he co-starred in Amira and Sam which was acquired by Drafthouse Films. In 2016, he co-starred in the comedy The Late Bloomer. His other feature credits include HBO's Shot in the Heart directed by Agnieszka Holland and Liongate's Peaceful Warrior.

In 2014, he was cast in the film Mother's Day, and it was also announced he was set to star in and produce a science fiction film called Convergence. He also co-starred in The Baytown Outlaws.

In 2014, Wesley was given the Humane Generation Award for his work with the Humane Society, speficially farm animal welfare.

Additionally, Wesley has hosted two fundraising campaigns on Represent.com to raise funds for charity. For his first campaign, Wesley released a cat shirt design to raise funds for The Humane Society of the United States. The campaign sold almost 3,000 units. For his second campaign, Wesley teamed up with The Vampire Diaries co-star Ian Somerhalder to release a limited-edition shirt designed by a fan, with the words "Blood Brothers Since 1864." This campaign sold almost 10,000 shirts.

2018–present: Directing, theatre roles, and Tell Me a Story
Wesley began directing The Vampire Diaries in its fifth season and produced the series at the start of season 8. He directed episode 16 in season 2 of Shadowhunters for Freeform. In November 2016, it was announced that under the label of his newly formed production company, Citizen Media, Wesley signed a deal with Warner Bros. Television to produce four new television shows, including Confessions of a Drug-Addicted High School Teacher, written by Jason Smith; Pecos, written by Shawn Christensen; Finding Natalie, written by Hilary Bettis and Shanghai Summer, written by Oanh Ly.

His theater work includes the co-lead in the well-received off-Broadway production Cal in Camo at the Rattlestick Theater in New York City. He was also the co-lead in Sensitive Skin, written by Shem Bitterman. In March 2018, Wesley joined the New York Theater Workshop's production of Zurich in New York City.

In June 2018, it was reported that Wesley had joined the main cast of the CBS All Access TV series Tell Me a Story, which was created by Kevin Williamson. Wesley currently has a development deal at Kapital Entertainment. Other network television directing credits include Shadowhunters and Roswell, New Mexico. He also starred in the second episode of the Netflix miniseries Medal of Honor as Staff Sergeant Clint Romesha.

Upcoming projects
On March 15, 2022, it was announced Wesley was cast as James T. Kirk for the second season of Star Trek: Strange New Worlds on Paramount+.

Other ventures
In 2020, Wesley and his former The Vampire Diaries co-star Ian Somerhalder announced the launch of a straight bourbon whiskey, Brother's Bond Bourbon.

Personal life

Wesley met and began dating Torrey DeVitto in 2007 when they acted together in Killer Movie. They married in a private ceremony in New York City in April 2011. In July 2013, it was reported that they had filed for divorce. The divorce was finalized in December 2013.

Wesley lived in Atlanta, Georgia, while filming The Vampire Diaries and the rest of the time with DeVitto in Los Angeles, California. He sold his Los Angeles residence after his divorce from DeVitto. In February 2019, Wesley married Ines de Ramon. They separated in 2022. 

Wesley is an ethical vegan who advocates for animal rights.

Filmography

Awards and nominations

References

External links

 
 

1982 births
20th-century American male actors
21st-century American male actors
American male television actors
American people of Polish descent
Christian Brothers Academy (New Jersey) alumni
Living people
Male actors from New Jersey
Marlboro High School alumni
People from Marlboro Township, New Jersey
People from New Brunswick, New Jersey
Rutgers University alumni